Taihe is a town under the administration of Sheqi County, Henan, China. , it has eight villages under its administration:
Liuji Village
Fanlou Village
Mageng Village
Yandiangang Village
Songzhuang Village
Houzhao Village
Yugou Village
Yunling Village

References 

Towns in Nanyang, Henan
Sheqi County